Russograptis medleri is a species of moth of the family Tortricidae. It is found in Nigeria.

The length of the forewings is about 8 mm. The ground colour of the forewings is grey with a weak bluish hue and orange terminal scales. The costa is orange spotted with brown and the distal area is orange-cream with grey suffusions. The tornal blotch is brown and followed by a cream-brown area. There is also a delicate red pattern. The hindwings are brown, mixed with cream basally.

References

Endemic fauna of Nigeria
Moths described in 1981
Tortricini
Moths of Africa
Taxa named by Józef Razowski